This is a list of the municipalities in the province of Segovia in the autonomous community of Castile-Leon, Spain.

See also

Geography of Spain
List of cities in Spain

External links 
 Ayuntamiento de Segovia

 
Segovia